Toten is a traditional district in Innlandet county in the eastern part of Norway. It consists of the municipalities Østre Toten and Vestre Toten.

The combined population of Toten is approximately 27,000. The largest town is Raufoss with approximately 6,000 inhabitants. In the mostly rural municipality of Østre Toten, Lena is the biggest settlement with approximately 1100 inhabitants.

Agriculture is an integral aspect of the economy of Toten. The agricultural focus lies mostly in Østre Toten, whereas Vestre Toten is a center for industry. In Toten, large forest areas can be found. These are important recreational areas, and serve as popular hunting and fishing grounds. The forests are hosts to elk and deer as well as small game such as rabbits and fowl. There are plenty of smaller lakes in which fish such as char, perch, pike and trout can be found.

The highest point in Østre Toten is Torseterkampen at 841 meters above sea level. In Vestre Toten, Lauvhøgda at 722 meters above sea level is the highest point.

Dialect 
The dialect spoken in Toten is North-East Norwegian. It has preserved some archaic elements, such as the dative case (einn hæst - hæst`n, hæstér - hæstá in nominative, but hæstà - hæstóm in dative). A characteristic of North-East Norwegian dialects is that feminine nouns may end in -u or -o, and masculine nouns may end in -a or -å. Infinitives end in -e, -a and -å.

References

External links 
 Sound sample on Toten (and Bergen) dialect (YouTube)
 Sound sample on Toten dialect (YouTube)

Districts of Innlandet
Districts of Oppland